Rachel Alexandra Wilson (born May 12, 1977) is a Canadian actress. She is best known for her roles as Heather in Total Drama and Courtney in the first two episodes of Total Drama Island and Tamira Goldstein in Breaker High.

Life and career
Wilson was born in Ottawa, Ontario. She started acting at age 12, working extensively in Toronto, Vancouver and Los Angeles. Wilson's roles include Dr. Nikki Renholds on CBC's Republic of Doyle, Donna on the web series "My Pal Satan", and leads in St. Roz, Puck Hogs, Man v. Minivan, and 75 El Camino (the latter two were accepted at the 2009 Toronto International Film Festival). Television credits include  The Two Mr. Kissels for Lifetime, Breaker High, Kevin Hill, Judging Amy, Charmed, Show Me Yours, Gideon's Crossing, and Hellions.  Wilson also voices the character of Heather in Total Drama.

Filmography

Film

Television

References

External links

1977 births
20th-century Canadian actresses
21st-century Canadian actresses
Actresses from Ottawa
Canadian child actresses
Canadian film actresses
Canadian television actresses
Canadian voice actresses
Living people